Shidu may refer to:

 Shidu, Beijing (十渡镇), town in Fangshan District
 Shidu, Yanling County, Hunan (十都镇), town
 Shidu (bereavement), loss of one's only child